Barnet London Borough Council in London, England is elected every four years. Since the last boundary changes in 2002, 63 councillors have been elected from 21 wards.

Political control
Since the first election to the council in 1964 political control of the council has been held by the following parties:

Leadership
The leaders of the council since 1969 have been:

Council elections
 1964 Barnet London Borough Council election
 1968 Barnet London Borough Council election (boundary changes increased the number of seats by four)
 1971 Barnet London Borough Council election
 1974 Barnet London Borough Council election
 1978 Barnet London Borough Council election (boundary changes took place but the number of seats remained the same)
 1982 Barnet London Borough Council election
 1986 Barnet London Borough Council election
 1990 Barnet London Borough Council election
 1994 Barnet London Borough Council election (boundary changes took place but the number of seats remained the same)
 1998 Barnet London Borough Council election
 2002 Barnet London Borough Council election (boundary changes increased the number of seats by three)
 2006 Barnet London Borough Council election
 2010 Barnet London Borough Council election
 2014 Barnet London Borough Council election
 2018 Barnet London Borough Council election
 2022 Barnet London Borough Council election (boundary changes took place but the number of seats remained the same)

Borough result maps

By-election results
By-elections occur when seats become vacant between council elections. Below is a summary of recent by-elections; full by-election results can be found by clicking on the by-election name.

Notes

References

By-election results

External links
Barnet Council

 
Politics of the London Borough of Barnet